Salvador Arturo Coreas Privado (born 22 November 1960 in Quelepa) is a retired Salvadoran football player who has also been working as a coach.

He currently is the coach of C.D. Aguila

He is the brother of Víctor Coreas Privado, the late Luis Abraham Coreas Privado, Marcos Coreas and Carlos Coreas.

Club career
Nicknamed Macho Seco, Coreas started playing football in the youth team of Quelepita and moved to local rivals Liberal when 14 years old. A year later he joined Second division side Liberal and he subsequently left them for Obrajuelo. In 1976, he signed for Salvadoran giants Águila, where he would play alongside great players like José Francisco Jovel and stay for 17 years. A pacy winger, he was played at both the left and right side of the field. In 1993, he had a season with American Professional Soccer League side Los Angeles Salsa.

International career
Coreas has represented El Salvador in 6 FIFA World Cup qualification matches, 

His final international game was a June 1994 friendly match against Brazil.

International goals
Scores and results list El Salvador's goal tally first.

References

External links
 Salvador Coreas: "El fútbol fue una religión para los Coreas" - El Gráfico

1960 births
Living people
People from San Miguel Department (El Salvador)
Association football wingers
Salvadoran footballers
El Salvador international footballers
C.D. Águila footballers
Los Angeles Salsa players
American Professional Soccer League players
Salvadoran expatriate footballers
Expatriate soccer players in the United States
Salvadoran expatriate sportspeople in the United States
Salvadoran football managers